Johannes Lichtenberger (died 1503) was a noted German astrologer. He seems to have been, briefly in the early 1470s, court astrologer to the Emperor Frederick III. He was much published, and various pseudonyms are attributed to him. His 1488 Prognosticatio in latino, published at Heidelberg, was well known and appeared in numerous subsequent editions and translations.

References
 Dietrich Kurze (1960) Johannes Lichtenberger (+1503) : eine Studie zur Geschichte der Prophetie und Astrologie
 
 W. Harry Rylands (editor) (1890) Prognosticatio in Latino by John Lichtenberg (reproduction of 1488 edition)

Notes

External links
Astrological bibliography, many attributions

Year of birth missing
1503 deaths
German astrologers
15th-century astrologers
16th-century astrologers